Laboissière-Le Déluge is a railway station located in Laboissière-en-Thelle near Le Déluge in the Oise department, France.  It is served by TER Hauts-de-France trains from Paris-Nord to Beauvais.

See also
List of SNCF stations in Hauts-de-France

References

Railway stations in Oise